This is a list of governors for Örebro County in Sweden, from 1634 to present. In 1779 Värmland County separated from Närke and Värmland County and the county was renamed into Örebro County.

Footnotes

References

Orebro